Workout From Within with Jeff Halevy is an American syndicated talk show airing weekly in the U.S. It debuted on April 25, 2013. The half-hour-long primetime program is produced and  distributed in the U.S. by Veria.

Details
The show’s focus is on healthy living, including the mental, physical, and nutritional aspects of same. Show host, Jeff Halevy and his guests, which include professional athletes and celebrities such as football legend Tiki Barber and super model Emme, share their personal healthy living experiences and challenges, as Halevy both guides and interviews them on each episode. Topics covered include motivation, couples workouts, diet, exercise, nutrition, weekend warriors, and staying on track with a healthy regimen.
 
One of the show's signature concepts is making a healthy lifestyle easy. Halevy has demonstrated this concept on various national morning shows, through both exercise, meditation, and nutrition advice.

References

External links
Workout From Within with Jeff Halevy Official Website
 

2013 American television series debuts
2010s American television talk shows
Health information television series
First-run syndicated television programs in the United States
American television talk shows